Bohumil Musil (10 May 1922 – 5 December 1999) was a Czech football player and later manager.

As a player, Musil played for several Czechoslovak clubs, but never gained any success with them. He was far more successful as a football coach. After finishing his active career, Musil started to work as a football manager. He coached famous Prague clubs, Dukla Prague and Slavia Prague. He also coached briefly Czechoslovakia national football team.

He led Dukla Prague to two Czechoslovak First League championships, in 1953 and 1966. In 1966 he also won the Czechoslovak Cup with Dukla. Musil was noted for his coaching skills of youth football teams.

References
  SK Slavia Praha profile
 Hall of Fame Dukla Praha Profile

1922 births
1999 deaths
Czech footballers
Czechoslovak footballers
FC Fastav Zlín players
Czech football managers
Czechoslovak football managers
Dukla Prague managers
FK Dukla Banská Bystrica managers
Bohemians 1905 managers
SK Slavia Prague managers
Czechoslovakia national football team managers
Association footballers not categorized by position
Footballers from Prague